The Uzbekistan men's national tennis team represents Uzbekistan in Davis Cup tennis competition and is governed by the Uzbekistan Tennis Federation.

Uzbekistan currently compete in the Asia/Oceania Zone of Group I.  They have never competed in the World Group, but reached the Play-offs on nine occasions (1998-2001, 2009, 2012, 2014-2016 and 2018).

History
Uzbekistan competed in its first Davis Cup in 1994. Uzbek players previously competed for the USSR.

Current team (2022)

 Sergey Fomin
 Denis Istomin 
 Khumoyun Sultanov 
 Sanjar Fayziev
 Maxim Shin

Statistics
''Last updated: United States – Uzbekistan; 7 March 2020

Record
Total: 38–26 (59.4%)

Head-to-head record (1994–)

Record against continents

Record by decade

1990–1999: 14–5 (73.7%)
2000–2009: 13–10 (56.5%)
2010–2019: 11–10 (52.4%)
2020–2029: 0–1 (0.0%)

See also
Davis Cup
Uzbekistan Fed Cup team

External links

Davis Cup teams
Davis Cup
Davis Cup